Anisoplaca acrodactyla is a species of moth of the family Gelechiidae. It was described by Edward Meyrick in 1907 and is endemic to New Zealand. This species has been observed in South Island as well as in the North Island. Larvae feed on species in the genera Hoheria and Plagianthus including the species Plagianthus regius''''.

Taxonomy

This species was first described by Edward Meyrick in 1907 and named Gelechia acrodactyla. Meyrick used three specimens collected in native forest in Invercargill by Alfred Philpott. In 1915 Meyrick placed this species within the genus Anisoplaca. In 1928 George Hudson described and illustrated this species. John S. Dugdale confirmed the placement of this species in the genus Anisoplaca in 1988. The male lectotype specimen, collected at Invercargill, is held at the Natural History Museum, London.

Description
Edward Meyrick described this species as follows:

Distribution
This species is endemic to New Zealand. It is known from the North and South Island and has been observed at its type locality of Invercargill as well as in Dunedin, Wyndham, Banks Peninsular and in the area around the Homer Tunnel.

Behaviour
The adults of this species are on the wing in November and December.

Host species

The larvae of A. acrodactyla feed on the fruit of Plagianthus regius and adult moths have been reared from larvae feeding on species in the genera of Plagianthus and Hoheria.

References

Anisoplaca
Moths described in 1907
Moths of New Zealand
Taxa named by Edward Meyrick
Endemic fauna of New Zealand
Endemic moths of New Zealand